Fontaines D.C. are an Irish post-punk band formed in Dublin in 2017. The band consists of Grian Chatten (vocals), Carlos O'Connell (guitar), Conor Curley (guitar), Conor Deegan III (bass), and Tom Coll (drums).

After meeting while attending music college, and bonding over a common love of poetry, the band began self-releasing singles and performing live regularly, signing to Partisan Records in 2018. The band's debut album, Dogrel, was released on 12 April 2019 to widespread critical acclaim; it was listed as Album of the Year on the record store Rough Trade's website, voted Album of the Year by presenters on BBC Radio 6 Music, and was nominated for both the Mercury Prize and the Choice Music Prize.

The band's second studio album, A Hero's Death, was written and recorded in the midst of extensive touring for their debut, and was released on 31 July 2020. A Hero's Death was later nominated for Best Rock Album at the 2021 Grammy Awards. Their third album Skinty Fia, released in 2022, became the band's first to reach number one on the Irish Albums Chart and UK Albums Chart.

History

Formation  
Carlos O'Connell, Conor Curley, Conor Deegan, Grian Chatten, and Tom Coll met while attending music college at BIMM in The Liberties, Dublin. They bonded over a common love of poetry and collectively released two collections of poetry, one called Vroom, inspired by the Beat poets (Jack Kerouac, Allen Ginsberg) and another called Winding, inspired by Irish poets (Patrick Kavanagh, James Joyce, W. B. Yeats). None of the published poems were translated into songs, but the track "Television Screens" on their debut Dogrel started out as a poem and was turned into a song.

Lead singer Chatten is half-English (his mother is English and his father is Irish) and was born in Barrow-in-Furness, Cumbria but grew up in the County Fingal coastal town of Skerries, north of Dublin. Prior to starting Fontaines D.C., Chatten was a part of local indie rock bands Gun Runner and Thumbprint, serving as a drummer and guitarist/singer respectively.

Coll and Deegan hail from Castlebar in County Mayo, while Curley is from Emyvale in County Monaghan, and O'Connell grew up in Madrid, Spain. Deegan is regularly seen wearing Mayo GAA clothing during live performances.

The band got their name from a character in the movie The Godfather called Johnny Fontane, a singer and movie star portrayed by Al Martino. Fontane was godson of Vito Corleone. Originally they were called The Fontaines, but they added the initials "D.C." when a band in Los Angeles had the same name. The initials D.C. stand for "Dublin City".

Early career 
Fontaines D.C. started out self-releasing singles. In 2015 they were going to release their debut with music journalist John Robb's Louder Than War label. In May 2017, Fontaines released the single "Liberty Belle" followed by "Hurricane Laughter"/"Winter In the Sun". "Liberty Belle" is in homage to the Liberties, a neighbourhood in Dublin where many band members lived.

In 2018, Fontaines released the single "Chequeless Reckless"/"Boys In The Better Land" and "Too Real". Stereogum, who premiered "Chequeless Reckless" in early 2018, described their sound "a synthesis between post-punk, garage rock, and a kind of gritty, urbane sense of rhythm and narrative" and naming them a 'Band To Watch'.

In May 2018, Fontaines played an in-studio at KEXP in Seattle. In November 2018, the band signed with Partisan Records.

They released music videos directed by frequent collaborator Hugh Mulhern. The video for 2018's "Too Real" was inspired by The Pogues's 1985 song, "A Pair of Brown Eyes" and the band Gilla Band, among other concepts. The 2019 video for the song Conor Curley co-wrote called "Roy's Tune" was directed by Liam Papadachi and was inspired by Curley's late night walks home from a job at a burrito shop.

Fontaines received tour support from Irish Arts Council which allowed them to tour internationally. They also received grant funding from RTÉ 2fm.

Dogrel 

On 12 April 2019, the band released their debut album Dogrel on Partisan Records. The title Dogrel is an homage to Doggerel, working class Irish poetry – 'poetry of the people' – that dates back to 1630. It was popularised by William McGonagall and later Ogden Nash. The record was recorded live on tape.

The NME said that "Dogrel proves that early-days pinning as punk’s next great hope was perhaps premature – there's far more to Fontaines D.C. than your typical thrashed-out, pissed-off young rebellion." The Guardian gave the album a five-star review, hailing it as a "perfect debut", and commending Chatten for embracing the Dublin accent. Paul Duggan gave the album an unprecedented 10 bananas out of 10. The Times said that "Shouty post-punk bands are making a surprise comeback in 2019, with this brutal but articulate Irish bunch emerging as one of the most captivating. Capturing the feeling of living in Dublin as it balances historical weight with financial upheaval, the singer Grian Chattan makes his statement of intent by announcing in a monotone rant on the opener, Big: “Dublin in the rain is mine, a pregnant city with a Catholic mind.""

In 2019, the band extensively toured fifty cities throughout Ireland, Europe, and North America. They have toured with Shame and Idles. They played nine sets at SXSW 2019 over the course of five days, selling out venues, and count Gilla Band as a major influence.

They were the musical guest on The Tonight Show Starring Jimmy Fallon on 1 May 2019, performing "Boys in the Better Land".

They were supposed to perform at the Glastonbury Festival in 2020; This was going to be the festival's 50th anniversary but it had to be cancelled due to the increasing concerns over the COVID-19 pandemic. On 14 July 2020, they performed a live set from Dublin's iconic Kilmainham Gaol as part of the live television series Other Voices. The recording of the performance was released on vinyl as a limited edition release for Record Store Day on 12 June 2021 and later as a surprise digital release on 26 November 2021.

A Hero's Death 
The band released their second album on 31 July 2020, titled A Hero's Death. The band released the title track on 5 May 2020; the music video features actor Aidan Gillen. Chatten described the single as "a list of rules for the self". Three further singles were released from the album: "I Don't Belong", "Televised Mind" and "A Lucid Dream". The band returned to The Tonight Show as musical guests, performing "A Hero's Death" on 28 January 2021. The album was nominated for Best Rock Album at the 2021 Grammy Awards, but lost to The Strokes' The New Abnormal.

Skinty Fia 
In January 2022, the band announced their third studio album Skinty Fia. It was released on 22 April 2022. To coincide with the album's announcement, the band shared its lead single "Jackie Down the Line" with an accompanying music video. Toronto's Spill Magazine praised Skinty Fia as "an important album, perhaps the most important album of the year", hailing it as a strong contender for 2022 album of the year.

Band members 

 Carlos O'Connell – guitar, backing vocals
 Conor Curley – guitar, piano, backing vocals
 Conor Deegan III – bass guitar, guitar, backing vocals
 Grian Chatten – lead vocals, tambourine
 Tom Coll – drums, percussion, guitar
Touring members

 Cathal Mac Gabhann – guitar (2023)

Discography

Albums

Studio albums

Live albums

EPs

Singles

Other charted songs

Awards and nominations

Works and publications 
 Vroom (self-published) – poetry chapbook
 Winding (self-published) – poetry chapbook

Notes

References

External links 

  – official site
 Fontaines D.C. at Partisan Records
 

Irish post-punk music groups
Partisan Records artists
Musical groups established in 2017
Musical groups from Dublin (city)
2017 establishments in Ireland
Brit Award winners